Bavarian A I engines were German steam locomotives in service with the Royal Bavarian State Railways (Königlich Bayerische Staatsbahn) from 1841 to 1871.

Three manufacturers were awarded a contract to build eight locomotives each, with the stipulation that the components of the different machines had to be interchangeable with one another. The engines achieved a speed of 33 km/h on a line with an incline of 1:200. The first engine was retired in 1871 and scrapped. Five other examples were rebuilt into B 1 locomotives and four were sold. The last one was scrapped in 1874.

They were coupled  with 2 T 3,35 tenders.

Der Münchner 

Der Münchner (a Münchner is a man from Munich) was a Bavarian Class A I engine with the number 25. It was originally built for a private railway company which ran the route between Munich and Augsburg. In 1844 the line was taken over by the state railway and the engine was transferred into state ownership. A large part of the locomotive came from England, which can be seen from the typically English 'pear' shape of the outer firebox.

It was coupled with a 2 T 3 tender.

See also
 List of Bavarian locomotives and railbuses

2-2-2 locomotives
A I
Standard gauge locomotives of Germany
Railway locomotives introduced in 1841
1A1 n2 locomotives
Passenger locomotives